Preston Alexander Kilwien (born November 25, 1996) is an American soccer player who currently plays as a defender for South Georgia Tormenta in the USL League One.

Career

Professional
Following a 2-week trial, Kilwien signed a professional contract with New York Red Bulls II on March 8, 2019.  He made his professional debut on April 13, 2019 in a 2–1 victory at Charlotte Independence.  Kilwien made 24 appearances, among the most of rookies on the team, and started 18 games as a central defender for NYRB II in 2019.  His 1,673 total minutes ranked ninth on the team.  The club announced on Dec. 4, 2019 it exercised the option on Kilwien's contract.

In April 2020 he represented New York Red Bulls II in the United Soccer League's USL eCup: Rocket League Edition. On August 13, 2020, he scored his first professional goal in a 2–1 loss to Loudoun United at Red Bull Arena.  In 2020, his second year with the team, he played in 12 matches in a pandemic-shortened season and was third on the team in minutes played.

He was released by Red Bulls II on November 30, 2020.

On January 21, 2021, Kilwien signed with USL Championship club Pittsburgh Riverhounds. He started 22 of his 30 appearances during the team's regular season he was fifth on the team with 941 total passes, fourth in clearances and fifth in interceptions.  On June 2, 2021 he was named Man of the Match by USLChampionship.com following the team's 3-2 victory at Loudoun United.  Following the conclusion of the regular season, Kilwien finished tied for runner-up as team’s Defender of the Year in a fan vote by the team’s Steel Army supporters group. 

On December 31, 2021, Kilwien signed with USL Championship club Charleston Battery. In 2022, he finished fourth on the team in starts with 24, fifth in appearances with 28 and played the fourth-most minutes with 2,103.  Kilwien earned the captain’s armband on six occasions.  He registered a team-high 20 blocks and was second in total passes with 1,182 and clearances with 71. Following the 2022 season, Kilwien was released by Charleston.

On January 23, 2023, he signed with defending USL League One champion South Georgia Tormenta on a two-year contract.

College
Kilwien spent his entire college career at Florida Gulf Coast University, receiving a B.A. in Integrated Studies in May 2020.  He made a total of 60 appearances for the Eagles and tallied 4 goals and 5 assists. In summer 2019 he was named FGCU's Most Outstanding Male Athlete. During his senior year at FGCU, he was named United Soccer Coaches Second Team All-Atlantic Region, ASUN Conference Defensive Player of the Year, and First Team All-ASUN Conference.  As a junior in 2017, Kilwien was named Second Team All-ASUN Conference and was a member of the ASUN Conference All-Freshman Team in 2015.

During his four years, FGCU compiled a 38–19–11 record, claimed two ASUN Conference championships and earned a second round 2016 NCAA Division I Men's Soccer Tournament appearance.  He scored the game-winning goal against Princeton on a 35-yard volley in his first college appearance in 2015, which was selected as the No. 3 play on ESPN SportsCenter's top 10 plays.

While at college, Kilwien played for Premier Development League sides South Florida Surf, Seattle Sounders U23 and Tampa Bay Rowdies U23.  In 2016, he was named to the PDL Team of the Week.  In 2018, he was named one of the league's preseason top 50 professional prospects.

Youth
Kilwien began playing organized soccer at the age of four.  He played club soccer for DeAnza Force SC (Cupertino, Calif.) at ages U8-9 then again at USSDA U17-18.  He also spent time as a youth with Crossfire Premier (Redmond, Wash.), Snohomish United (Shohomish, Wash.) East Bay Eclipse (Moraga, Calif.) and Diablo FC (Concord, Calif.).  In 2016, he helped lead FC Florida to the United States Youth Soccer Association U19 national championship final.  He played three soccer seasons at Campolindo High School, twice earning Offensive MVP honors, and also played receiver on the football team.  He graduated in 2015 from College Park High School (Pleasant Hill, California).

Personal life
Kilwien was born in Lubbock, Texas to Richard and Karen (Yee) Kilwien. His mother is a Limón, Costa Rica native.  She was a prep All-America and TABC Class 5A Player of the Year at Alief Elsik High School in Houston, Texas and played three seasons as a scholarship women's basketball student-athlete at the University of Houston.  Kilwien holds both United States and Costa Rica citizenship.

Preston Said to Legión A Lo Tico (A Costa Rican Sports medium) that he wants to play with the Costa Rica's National Team.  In October, 2022 he explained his dual citizenship status during a Charleston Battery recognition of Hispanic Heritage Month.

Career statistics

References

External links
New York Red Bulls II bio
Florida Gulf Coast Eagles bio
 
Kilwien’s Attitude of Gratitude Propels Pro Soccer Career

1996 births
Living people
American soccer players
American people of Costa Rican descent
Association football defenders
Charleston Battery players
Florida Gulf Coast Eagles men's soccer players
New York Red Bulls II players
People from Pleasant Hill, California
Pittsburgh Riverhounds SC players
Seattle Sounders FC U-23 players
Soccer players from California
South Florida Surf players
Sportspeople from the San Francisco Bay Area
USL Championship players
USL League Two players
De Anza Force players
Tormenta FC players